Hugh Ambrose Jennings (April 2, 1869 – February 1, 1928) was an American professional baseball player, coach and manager from 1891 to 1925. During those three seasons, Jennings had 355 runs batted in and hit .335, .386, and .401.

Jennings was a fiery, hard-nosed player who was not afraid to be hit by a pitch to get on base. In 1896, he was hit by pitches 51 times – a major league record that has never been broken. Jennings also holds the career record for being hit by pitches with 287, with Craig Biggio (who retired in 2007) holding the modern-day career record of 285. Jennings also played on the Brooklyn Superbas teams that won National League pennants in 1899 and 1900. From 1907 to 1920, Jennings was the manager of the Detroit Tigers, where he was known for his colorful antics, hoots, whistles, and his famous shouts of "Ee-Yah!" from the third base coaching box. Jennings suffered a nervous breakdown in 1925 that forced him to leave Major League Baseball. He died in 1928 and was posthumously inducted into the Baseball Hall of Fame in 1945.

Early years
Born in Pittston, Pennsylvania, Jennings was the son of Irish immigrants, James and Nora, who according to Jack Smiles's biography of Jennings, Ee-yah: The Life and Times of Hughie Jennings, Baseball Hall of Famer (page 7), arrived in Pittston in 1851.

Jennings worked as a breaker boy (young boys who separated the coal from the slate) in the local anthracite coal mines. He drew attention playing shortstop for a semi-professional baseball team in Lehighton, Pennsylvania in 1890.

Baltimore Orioles: 1893–1899
Jennings played with the Orioles for parts of seven seasons and became a star during his years in Baltimore. The Baltimore Orioles teams of 1894, 1895, and 1896 are regarded as one of the greatest teams of all time. The teams featured Hall of Fame manager Ned Hanlon and a lineup with six future Hall of Famers: first baseman Dan Brouthers, second baseman John McGraw, shortstop Jennings, catcher Wilbert Robinson, right fielder "Wee Willie" Keeler, and left fielder Joe Kelley. Amidst all those great players, Jennings was appointed captain in 1894, his first full season with the team.

During the Orioles' championship years, Jennings had some of the best seasons ever by a major league shortstop. In 1895, he hit .386, scored 159 runs, collected 204 hits, knocked in 125 runs, and stole 53 bases. In 1896, his performance was even better, as he hit .401 (2nd best in the National League) with 209 hits, 121 RBI, and 70 stolen bases.

The fiery Jennings was also known as one of the most fearless players of his time, allowing himself to be hit by pitches more than any other player. In one game, he was hit by a pitch three times. In 1896, he was hit by pitches 51 times—a Major League record that still stands. In just five seasons with the Orioles from 1894 to 1898, Jennings was hit by pitches an unprecedented 202 times. During one game, Jennings was hit in the head by a pitch from Amos Rusie in the 3rd inning, but managed to finish the game. As soon as the game ended, Jennings collapsed and was unconscious for three days.

Jennings was also one of the best fielding shortstops of the era. He led the National League in fielding percentage and putouts three times each. He had as many as 537 assists and 425 putouts in single seasons during his prime. His 425 putouts ties him with Donie Bush for the single season record for a shortstop. In 1895, he had a career-high range factor of 6.73–1.19 points higher than the league average (5.54) for shortstops that year. He once handled 20 chances in a game, and on another occasion had 10 assists in a game. In 1898, he threw his arm out, and his career as a shortstop came to an end. After that, Jennings was forced to move to first base.

Brooklyn Superbas and Philadelphia Phillies: 1899–1903
In 1899, when manager Ned Hanlon moved to the Brooklyn Superbas, several of his star players, including Jennings, Joe Kelley, and Willie Keeler followed.

In 1901, Jennings was traded to the Philadelphia Phillies. However, his failing arm cut his career short, as he never played in more than 82 games or hit above .272 in two seasons with the Phillies. Jennings played 6 games for the Superbas in 1903, effectively ending his playing career, with the exception of 9 at bats during his tenure as the manager of the Detroit Tigers.

Cornell Law School and an off-season law practice
While playing for the Orioles in the 1890s, Jennings and John McGraw both attended classes at St. Bonaventure University. After the 1899 season, Jennings was accepted to Cornell Law School. He managed the Cornell University baseball team while studying law and concluded that he was well-suited to being a manager. While at Cornell, he joined the Phi Delta Theta fraternity chapter there. Jennings continued as a scholar-athlete until the spring of 1904, when he left campus early to manage the Orioles. Though he never finished his law degree at Cornell, Jennings passed the Maryland bar exam in 1905 and started a law practice. Jennings practiced law in Baltimore and in Scranton, Pennsylvania. He continued to work at his law practice during the off-seasons through the remainder of his baseball career.

The "Ee-Yah" years: 1907–1920

In , Jennings was hired as manager of a talented Detroit Tigers team that included future Hall of Famers Ty Cobb and Sam Crawford. Jennings led the Tigers to three consecutive American League pennants, in –-. However, Jennings' teams lost the 1907 and 1908 World Series to the "Tinker to Evers to Chance" Chicago Cubs and the 1909 Series to Honus Wagner's Pittsburgh Pirates. Jennings continued to manage the Tigers through the  season, though his teams never won another pennant.

During his years as Detroit's manager, Jennings became famous for his antics, mostly in the third base coaching box, which variously included shouts of "Ee-Yah", and other whoops, whistles, horns, gyrations, jigs, and grass-plucking. The "Ee-Yah" whoop became his trademark and was accompanied with waves of both arms over his head and a sharp raising of his right knee. In 1907, he was suspended for taunting opponents with a tin whistle. The "Ee-Yah" shouts continued and became such a trademark that Jennings became known as Hughie "Ee-Yah" Jennings, and Detroit fans would shout "Ee-Yah" when Jennings appeared on the field. (See also Jack Smiles, Ee-yah: The Life And Times Of Hughie Jennings, Baseball Hall Of Famer)

Behind the antics was a great coaching mind. Connie Mack called Jennings one of the three greatest managers in history, along with John McGraw and Joe McCarthy. One of his greatest challenges, and accomplishments, during his years in Detroit was to manage the unmanageable—Ty Cobb. Jennings recognized Cobb's talent and his complicated psychological makeup and concluded the best strategy would be to let Cobb be Cobb. Jennings reportedly called Cobb aside one day and said, "There isn't anything about baseball I can teach you. Anything I might say to you would merely hinder you in your development. The only thing for you to do is go ahead and do as you please. Use your own judgment.. . . . . Do what you think is best and I'll back you up."

In , during a game in which "pick-ups" played for the Tigers when the regular team went on strike to protest the suspension of Cobb after an incident involving a fan in the stands whom Cobb assaulted, Jennings, who also sent his coaches in as substitute players, came to bat himself once as a pinch hitter. According to one source, when the umpire asked him for whom he was batting, Jennings answered, "None of your business." The umpire noted on his lineup sheet, "Jennings--batted for exercise."

While Jennings was fiery, hard-nosed, colorful, and even eccentric, he insisted he had always played the game honestly. When a scandal arose in  concerning whether Ty Cobb and Tris Speaker had fixed a  game between the Detroit and the Cleveland Indians while Jennings was the manager, Jennings initially spoke of how easy it would be to fix a game and issued a "no comment" on the specific game. After his "no comment" drew negative publicity, Jennings issued a statement to the press in December 1926 denying knowledge of the matter and adding, "My slate has been clean base ball for 35 years... Whatever I have done in base ball has been of such a nature that I would be ready any time to go before anyone and place my case before them." After the 1920 season, Jennings stepped down as the Tigers' manager. His 1,131 wins was the most in Tigers history until Sparky Anderson passed him in 1992.

New York Giants: 1921–1925
Jennings signed on as a coach with his old friend, John McGraw, who was managing the New York Giants. Jennings and McGraw, who met as teammates on the Orioles, became close friends. Jennings was the best man at McGraw's wedding and a pallbearer following the death of McGraw's 23-year-old wife in 1899. McGraw and Jennings staged a reunion year after year on their birthdays. His overall managing record was 1184-995.

Managerial record

A lifetime of tragic accidents
Jennings' life was filled with several tragic accidents. There was the beaning incident in Philadelphia that left him unconscious for three days. While attending Cornell, he fractured his skull diving head-first into a swimming pool at night, only to find the pool had been emptied. In December 1911, Jennings came close to death after an off-season automobile accident. In the crash, Jennings again fractured his skull, suffered a concussion of the brain, and broke both legs and his left arm. For several days after the accident, doctors were unsure if Jennings would survive.

The physical abuse and blows to the head undoubtedly took their toll. During the 1925 season, McGraw was ill, and Jennings was put in full charge of the Giants. The team finished in second place and the strain caught up with Jennings, who suffered a nervous breakdown when the season ended. According to his obituary, Jennings "was unable to report" to spring training in 1926 due to his condition. Jennings retired to the Winyah Sanatorium in Asheville, North Carolina. He did return home to Scranton, Pennsylvania, spending much of his time recuperating in the Pocono Mountains. In early 1928, Jennings died from meningitis in Scranton, Pennsylvania at age 58.

Jennings was elected to the Baseball Hall of Fame in 1945 as a player.

See also

 List of Major League Baseball career stolen bases leaders
 List of Major League Baseball player-managers
 List of Major League Baseball managers by wins
 1909 Detroit Tigers season

Notes

Further reading
Kashatus, William C.  Diamonds in the Coal Fields: 21 Remarkable Baseball Players, Managers and Umpires from Northeast Pennsylvania (McFarland, 2002).
Smiles, Jack. Ee-yah: The Life and Times of Hughie Jennings, Baseball Hall of Famer (McFarland, 2005).

External links

1869 births
1928 deaths
19th-century baseball players
Allentown (minor league baseball) players
American people of Irish descent
Baltimore Orioles (IL) managers
Baltimore Orioles (IL) players
Baltimore Orioles (NL) players
Baseball players from Philadelphia
Brooklyn Superbas players
Cornell Big Red baseball coaches
Cornell Law School alumni
Detroit Tigers managers
Detroit Tigers players
Georgia Bulldogs baseball coaches
Lancaster (minor league baseball) players
Louisville Colonels players
Major League Baseball player-managers
Major League Baseball shortstops
Major League Baseball third base coaches
Mansfield University of Pennsylvania alumni
Maryland lawyers
National Baseball Hall of Fame inductees
New York Giants (NL) coaches
New York Giants (NL) managers
Pennsylvania lawyers
Philadelphia Phillies players
People from Pittston, Pennsylvania
Semi-professional baseball players
Baseball players from Baltimore
Baseball players from Louisville, Kentucky
Sportspeople from Louisville, Kentucky
St. Bonaventure Bonnies baseball coaches
St. Bonaventure University alumni
Neurological disease deaths in Pennsylvania
Infectious disease deaths in Pennsylvania
Deaths from meningitis
19th-century American lawyers